Timothy Coghlan (29 March 1939 – 8 February 2004) was an English cricketer. He played twenty first-class matches for Cambridge University Cricket Club between 1958 and 1961.

See also
 List of Cambridge University Cricket Club players

References

External links
 

1939 births
2004 deaths
English cricketers
Cambridge University cricketers
Cricketers from Chelsea, London
L. C. Stevens' XI cricketers